Granja Nova is a civil parish in the municipality of Tarouca, Portugal. The population in 2011 was 396 and the population density was 57 inhabitants per square kilometre, in an area of 6.86 km2.

References

Freguesias of Tarouca